Isa Pola (19 December 1909 – 17 December 1984) was an Italian stage and film actress.

Born Maria Luisa Betti di Montesano, she appeared in more than 30 films during her career. An early screen role was the female lead in Steel (1933), a realist film set in the steelworking industry.

Selected filmography

 Miryam (1929)
 The Song of Love (1930)
 Mother Earth (1931)
 The Opera Singer (1932)
 The Last Adventure (1932)
 La Wally (1932)
 The Telephone Operator (1932)
 Steel (1933)
 Ragazzo (1934)
 Creatures of the Night (1934)
 The Anonymous Roylott (1936)
 It Was I! (1937)
 The Widow (1939)
 Lucrezia Borgia (1940)
 Bridge of Glass (1940)
 Girl of the Golden West (1942)
 The Za-Bum Circus (1944)
 The Children Are Watching Us (1944)
 Fury (1947)
 Angelo tra la folla (1950)
 Margaret of Cortona (1950)
 Shadows on the Grand Canal (1951)
 The Rival of the Empress (1951)
 Three Forbidden Stories (1952)
 The Queen of Sheba (1952)
 The Phantom Musketeer (1952)
 Love and Chatter (1958)

References

External links

Bibliography
 Landy, Marcia. The Folklore of Consensus: Theatricality in the Italian Cinema, 1930-1943. SUNY Press, 2008.

1909 births
1984 deaths
Italian film actresses
Italian stage actresses
Actors from Bologna
20th-century Italian actresses